Einar Vaage (March 1, 1889 – June 11, 1973) was a Norwegian actor.

Vaage was active in Oslo from 1921 onward, where he was engaged with the Central Theater (from 1925 to 1931) and the Oslo New Theater. The comedy roles that Vaage played include the clerk Styver in Henrik Ibsen's play Love's Comedy.

Vaage appeared in 49 Norwegian films. He played bit roles in most of them. Waage debuted in the silent film Madame besøker Oslo in 1927, and he played one of the lead roles in Sangen om Rondane in 1934, which was one of the first sound films in Norway. He is probably best remembered for his portrayal of Judge Nicolai Bals in Tante Pose (1940). Vaage's last film role was in the 1964 comedy Husmorfilmen høsten 1964.

Selected filmography

 1927: Madame besøker Oslo as Wagelsteen, a banker
 1934: Op med hodet! as an audience member
 1934: Sangen om Rondane as the wholesaler
 1936: Dyrk jorden! as Ola Engset
 1939: Familien på Borgan as a carpenter
 1940: Tante Pose as Judge Nicolai Bals
 1942: Det æ'kke te å tru as Storm, director
 1943: Sangen til livet as Brahm, a lawyer
 1943: Trysil-Knut as Crown the attorney
 1943: Den nye lægen as Mayor
 1944: Kommer du, Elsa? as the senior physician
 1946: Om kjærligheten synger de as Beine
 1948: Den hemmelighetsfulle leiligheten as the expedition leader
 1949: Døden er et kjærtegn as Toresen, a mechanic
 1949: Svendsen går videre
 1950: To mistenkelige personer as a tramp
 1951: Skadeskutt as the psychiatric hospital director
 1953: Skøytekongen
 1955: Hjem går vi ikke as Olsen, a caretaker
 1955: Savnet siden mandag as Haugen, the police lieutenant
 1963: Freske fraspark as the father-in-law
 1964: Husmorfilmen høsten 1964

References

External links
 
 Einar Vaage at the Swedish Film Database
 Einar Vaage at Filmfront

1889 births
1973 deaths
Norwegian male film actors
20th-century Norwegian male actors
People from Hamar